An azadithiolate cofactor is an anion with the formula NH(CH2S)22−. It is used as a cofactor in the [FeFe] hydrogenases, bacterial enzymes responsible for the reversible reduction of 2 H+ to H2. As a cofactor, the two thiolate functional groups are bound to each of the two irons in the active site of the enzyme in a bridging fashion. The amine functional group serves as an acid/base to transfer H+ from the solution to the active site. The proton transfer function of this cofactor is of great importance to the activity of the hydrogenase enzyme, as H2 evolution will not occur if the amine is not present.

References

Cofactors